Blue Pool Road is a road linking Happy Valley and Wong Nai Chung Gap on Hong Kong Island, Hong Kong.

Location
Blue Pool Road is divided into two sections. The first and longest section starts at Wong Nai Chung Road, opposite the southeastern part of Happy Valley Racecourse and continues uphill, until a roundabout at Tai Hang Road. The second section starts Tai Hang Road and continues uphill and ends in a dead end.

History
The road was previously occupied by Wong Nai Chung Village (黃泥涌村), which was settled by the Ngs (吳) and Yips (葉), both Hakkas from the Mainland, before British Colonization on Hong Kong Island. It was located part-way up the slope that Blue Pool Road follows today and below today's Village Road. Wong Nai Chung Village was replaced with residential buildings in the 1920s, as a consequence of urban development.

The street is named after the former "Blue Pool", a natural feature near the former Wong Nai Chung Village, in which people could bathe until around World War I. The Pool was fed by the Wong Nai Chung river, which then flowed into Victoria Harbour.

During the Battle of Hong Kong, troops of the Hong Kong Volunteer Defence Corps took part in the battle for Wong Nai Chung Gap on 18–20 December 1941, and held several positions, including at Blue Pool Road. On 22 December 1941, a massacre of Chinese civilians by Japanese troops occurred at Blue Pool Road. About 30 civilians were killed at Blue Pool Road during the Battle of Hong Kong.

Features
Blue Pool Road has several steep slopes. It is mainly lined with residential apartments, although there are a number of shops and the odd boutique hotel along the road. Several schools are located in the upper part of the street.
First section
No. 9: a temple complex occupies a small hill at the intersection with Ventris Road. It is the site of a Tam Kung Temple and a Tin Hau Temple. The Tam Kung Temple was built in 1901 after the previous one located on a slope near the Hong Kong Sanatorium and Hospital in Happy Valley, in the former Wong Nai Chung Village, was demolished during urban development. According to a story, Tam Kung appeared to a young boy in a dream and guided him to the present site, which was regarded as selected by the deity for the new location of the temple. A Tin Hau Temple, also relocated in 1901, is situated at the back of this temple. The temples have been managed by the Chinese Temples Committee since 1929.
No. 60: building housing the UNICEF Hong Kong head office and the administrative office of the Hong Kong Ballet.
Nos.118 and 120: two semi-detached houses which form one building. The plot was acquired in 1937 by Eu Tong-sen (余東旋), the founder of Eu Yan Sang, who built a number of apartment houses along Blue Pool Road and Broom Road. The three-storey apartment block was built in the International Modern style of the 1930s. The building was listed as a Grade III historic building in January 2010.
No. 123: Marymount Secondary School, a Catholic girls' school. The school moved to this location in October 1957.
Second section
No. 157: Hong Kong Japanese School (primary section). Opened in 1976.
No. 165: Lycée Français International Victor Segalen (French International School), secondary section

Transport
The lower end of Blue Pool Road is located near the Hong Kong Tramways Happy Valley terminus. Bus routes 1, 1P and 19 also service on the upper end of Blue Pool Road.

See also
List of streets and roads in Hong Kong
Tathong Channel

References

External links

Google Maps of Blue Pool Road 
Some details about Blue Pool Road air-raid shelter

Happy Valley, Hong Kong
Wong Nai Chung Gap
Roads on Hong Kong Island